Sialomorpha dominicana, also known as the mold pig, is a panarthropod genus of uncertain affinities discovered in 30-million year old Dominican amber by George Poinar at Oregon State University and Diane R. Nelson at East Tennessee University. It was placed in a new genus and family (Sialomorphidae) unto itself, and appears to represent a new phylum. S. dominicana shares some resemblance to tardigrades and mites. It is about 100 µm long and grew by molting its exoskeleton. It was probably an omnivore, feeding on minute invertebrates and fungi, including mold.

References

Invertebrates
Monotypic prehistoric animal genera
Fossil taxa described in 2019
Protostome enigmatic taxa
Dominican amber